Campbell Armstrong (25 February 1944 – 1 March 2013) was born Thomas Campbell Black and was a Scottish author who graduated with a degree in Philosophy from the University of Sussex, England. He taught creative writing from 1971 to 1974 at the State University of New York at Oswego; from 1975 to 1978 he taught at Arizona State University. He worked for some years as a fiction editor with various London publishing houses. After living for many years in England and the United States, he moved to Shannon Harbour, Ireland. He died on 1 March 2013, four days after his 69th birthday.

His novels Assassins & Victims and The Punctual Rape won Scottish Arts Council Awards. The Last Darkness and White Rage were nominated for the Prix du Polar. His quartet of Glasgow novels consists of The Bad Fire, The Last Darkness, White Rage, and Butcher. He also wrote a memoir titled All That Really Matters, retitled in the United States as I Hope You Have a Good Life.

Under his real name, "Campbell Black"—and under the pseudonym "Thomas Altman"—he wrote novelizations of movies including Raiders of the Lost Ark and Dressed to Kill, as well as thrillers and horror novels. He co-wrote the 1980 novel The Homing with Jeffrey Caine, under the pseudonym "Jeffrey Campbell."

His work was originally influenced by Robert Louis Stevenson, and he ascribed a certain "dark aspect" of his writing to the opening scenes of Treasure Island. Among other influences he included Franz Kafka, Fred Vargas, Kobo Abe, and Albert Camus.

His books have been translated into French, German, Greek, Japanese, Italian, Hebrew and Polish.

Bibliography
 The Wanting (1966)*
 Assassins & Victims (1969)*
 The Punctual Rape  (1970)*
 Death's Head (1971)*
 Black Christmas (Novelization) (1976)**
 Brainfire (1977)
 Letters from the Dead (1980)*
 Dressed to Kill (Novelization) (1980)*
 Raiders of the Lost Ark (Novelization) (1981)
 Mr. Apology (1984)*
 The Piper (1986)*
 Jig (1987)
 Mazurka (1988)
 Mambo (1989)
 Agents of Darkness (1991)
 Asterisk (1992)
 Concert of Ghosts (1992)
 Jigsaw (1994)
 Heat (1996)
 Blackout (1996)
 Silencer (1997)
 Deadline (2000)

[*]= as "Campbell Black"

[**]= as "Thomas Altman"

The Glasgow Novels
 Bad Fire (2002)
 The Last Darkness (2003)
 White Rage (2004)
 Butcher (2006)

Memoir
 I Hope You Have a Good Life  (UK title: All That Really Matters) (2000)

Plays
 Death’s Head (BBC-TV) (1968)
 And They Used to Star in Movies (Peacock, Dublin: Travers, Edinburgh; Body Politic, Chicago. Soho Poly, London) (1970)
 The Trial of Mr. Punch on Charges of Cruelty (2008)
 Whispering (radio play broadcast by the BBC in 2008)

References

External links
"An Interview with Campbell Armstrong"
Official website
Interview
Biography

1944 births
2013 deaths
Writers from Glasgow
Academics from Glasgow
Alumni of the University of Sussex
Arizona State University faculty
State University of New York at Oswego faculty
Scottish male novelists